Maragondon, officially the Municipality of Maragondon, is a 3rd class municipality in the province of Cavite, Philippines. According to the 2020 census, it has a population of 40,687 people. The town is famous for its bamboo crafts, Mounts Palay-Palay–Mataas-na-Gulod Protected Landscape which includes Mount Pico de Loro, and various ancestral houses and structures important to Philippine history and culture such as Maragondon Church and the execution site and trial house of national hero Andres Bonifacio.

History

The name Maragondon is a Spanish approximation of the Tagalog word maragundong, which means "having a rumbling or thunderous sound". This refers to the noise coming from the Kay Albaran river in the village of Capantayan. This was initially the place on which the town was to be built. However, due to the floods caused by the frequent overflowing of the river, the town was later relocated to its present site.

Incidentally, Maragondon has three foundation dates; namely, 1. ) 1611 when the Franciscan Fathers from Silang established their first visita or chapel; 2.) 1690, the fundacion ecclesiastica or founding of the regular parish by the Jesuits, dedicating it to Our Lady of the Assumption; 3.) 1727, the fundacion civil, when the original barrio of Maragondon was separated from Silang during the administration of the Recollects and converted into an independent municipality with Gregorio Silvestre as the first gobernadorcillo. Maragondon belonged to the corregimiento of Mariveles (now Bataan province) until 1754, when Spanish governor general Pedro Manuel de Arandia (1754–1759) abolished the politico-military administration and restored Maragondon to Cavite province. Alongside Silang, the town's territory was very large during its early decades.

In the second half of the 19th century the towns of Ternate, Magallanes, Gen. Emilio Aguinaldo (formerly Bailen), Alfonso, and Naic were mere barangays of Maragondon. Ternate was the first town to attain full independence on March 31, 1857, under an agreement signed by Tomas de Leon, Felix Nigosa, Pablo de Leon, Florencio Nino Franco and Juan Ramos in behalf of the people of Ternate.

Furthermore, Bailen (now Gen. Aguinaldo) and Alfonso seceded from Maragondon in 1858. Naic then severed as a town in 1869. Magallanes was the last of the villages to attain independence, having been founded on July 15, 1879, under an agreement signed by Crisostomo Riel representing Maragondon, and by Isidro Bello and company representing Magallanes.

Geography

Barangays
Maragondon is politically subdivided into 27 barangays.

Climate

Demographics

Government

Elected officials
The following are the elected officials of the town elected last May 09, 2022 which serves until 2025:

Images

References

External links

[ Philippine Standard Geographic Code]
Philippine Census Information

Municipalities of Cavite